Carolina Cotton (October 20, 1925 – June 10, 1997) was an American singer and actress known as the "Yodeling Blonde Bombshell", the "Girl of the Golden West", and the "Queen of the Range."

Early life
Cotton was born Helen Hagstrom October 20, 1925 in Cash, Arkansas, to a farming family who moved to San Francisco during the Great Depression. She took dancing classes and became a child singer, and gradually accompanied traveling shows.

Career
At the age of 16, she was a high school student who would visit a radio station to watch Dude Martin’s Roundup Gang. When the band's yodeler left to get married, Martin asked her whether she could yodel. She replied, "Sure I can! Why not?" — though she had never before yodeled. Martin gave her her nickname "Carolina"  because he reckoned that Arkansas was not so well recognized in California The surname "Cotton" came later thanks to fans and a radio disc jockey named Cottonseed Clark.

In 1944, while in Hollywood to pick up costumes, she bumped into songwriter Johnny Marvin. He offered her a part in a film called Sing Neighbor Sing that led to a kid-sister speaking part and a song specialty in I'm from Arkansas. She was then asked to join the Spade Cooley Orchestra, where she doubled on bass fiddle.

In 1945 she married western bandleader Deuce Spriggens. The marriage lasted only three months, but it was important to her career because she began making appearances with Spriggens in feature films for Columbia Pictures. Columbia signed her as an actress, and she appeared opposite the studio's cowboy stars Ken Curtis, Gene Autry, and Charles Starrett. She stated she stopped making films only when they no longer made B Westerns.

Cotton hosted a program called Carolina Calls twice a week on the Armed Forces Radio Services in the late 1940s and early 1950s and made tours of Germany and Korea. She made a variety of television appearances (a planned series, Queen of the Range never came to be), and she was featured opposite superstar western bandleader Bob Wills in a series of Snader Telescriptions, three-minute videos made for television.

Inspired by meeting many children around the world during her travels, Cotton decided to become a teacher, but still performed occasionally, especially at western film festivals. She retired from Mount Vernon Elementary School in Bakersfield, California, in early 1997, and died in June, after battling ovarian cancer for three years.

References

External links

Encyclopedia of Arkansas entry
Rockabilly Hall of Fame

1925 births
1997 deaths
20th-century American actresses
20th-century American singers
20th-century American women singers
Actresses from Arkansas
American radio personalities
Deaths from cancer in California
People from Craighead County, Arkansas
Singing cowboys
Western (genre) film actresses
Yodelers
20th-century American male singers